John Henry Quast (April 4, 1900 – August 9, 1966) was an American football end for the Louisville Brecks of the National Football League.

References 
 
 Johnny Quast at The Pro Football Archives

1900 births
1966 deaths
American football ends
Louisville Brecks players
Players of American football from Louisville, Kentucky